Six countries have been chosen FIFA Women's World Cup hosts in the competition's eight editions from the inaugural tournament in 1991 until the tournament played in 2019.

History
The decision to hold the first tournament in China was made by FIFA, football's international governing body, after China hosted a prototype world championship three years earlier, the 1988 FIFA Women's Invitation Tournament. The first Women's World Cup was sponsored by Mars, Incorporated. With FIFA still reluctant to bestow their "World Cup" brand, the tournament was officially known as the 1st FIFA World Championship for Women's Football for the M&M's Cup.

Only China and the United States have hosted the event on more than one occasion. The 2003 edition was originally awarded to China, but was moved to the United States in May 2003 due to the SARS outbreak. China were instead awarded the right to host the following edition in 2007.

List of hosts

References

External links
 

Hosts
Hosts
Sports competitions bids